Johnny Li Khai-kam (born 16 July 1966 in Hong Kong) is a two-time Hong Kong Olympic swimmer in the 1984 and 1988 Summer Olympics. In 1981, he set the Hong Kong age group record for 14-year-olds in the 100 metres freestyle at British Swimming's Age Group Championships, a record which stood until 2005 when it was broken by Geoffrey Cheah. 

Li also had a minor career as a television actor with TVB. In 2013 he appeared in three episodes of Ghetto Justice II, and later in one episode of Triumph in the Skies II in the role of the swimming coach of Him Law's character.

Personal life
Li graduated from Wah Yan College in Wan Chai in 1983, and went on to study at UC Berkeley. While a student there, he married Commercial Radio Hong Kong DJ  in 1987 after learning that she was pregnant with his first daughter, whom they named . Lamb moved to California to be with Li. The couple went on to have another daughter Tiffany, but divorced in 1992.

References

External links
Profile at hkswim.com

1966 births
Living people
Hong Kong male freestyle swimmers
Swimmers at the 1984 Summer Olympics
Swimmers at the 1988 Summer Olympics
Olympic swimmers of Hong Kong
Swimmers at the 1982 Commonwealth Games
Swimmers at the 1986 Commonwealth Games
Commonwealth Games competitors for Hong Kong
Alumni of Wah Yan
University of California, Berkeley alumni
Swimmers at the 1982 Asian Games
Swimmers at the 1986 Asian Games
Asian Games competitors for Hong Kong